The North Carolina General Assembly of 1785 met in New Bern from November 18, 1785,  to December 29, 1785.  The assembly consisted of the 114 members of the North Carolina House of Commons and 54 senators of North Carolina Senate elected by the voters on August 19, 1785.  During the 1785 session, the legislature created Rockingham County.  As prescribed by the 1776 Constitution of North Carolina the General Assembly elected Richard Caswell to continue as Governor of North Carolina and members of the Council of State.

Councilors of State
As prescribed by the 1776 Constitution of North Carolina, the General Assembly elected Richard Caswell as  governor on December 9, 1785, and the following members of the North Carolina Council of State:
 Joseph Leech, Craven County, President, elected on December 10, 1785, 
 James Gillespie, Duplin County, elected on December 10, 1785
 Winston Caswell, Dobbs County, Clerk
 John Hawks, Craven County, elected on December 10, 1785
 William McClure, Craven County, elected on December 10, 1785
 John Spicer, Onslow County, elected on December 10, 1785
 Green Hill, Franklin County, elected on December 12, 1785
 Miles King, Richmond County, elected on December 28, 1785
James Glasgow continued as North Carolina Secretary of State.

Assembly membership

House of Commons members

There were 114 positions authorized for the House of Commons in this assembly, including one representative from each of six districts and 54 counties.  Only 105 delegates are known to have attended this House of Commons assembly.

Fayette County, which was formed in July 1784 from the eastern part of Cumberland County, reverted to Cumberland County three months later, so does not appear in this assembly.

Greene, Sullivan and Washington Counties had formed the State of Franklin in an attempt to create a new state.  They did not send representatives to this assembly.

Anson, Bladen, and Gates County only sent one elected official to the House of Commons.

The House of Commons delegates elected a Speaker (Richard Dobbs Spaight), Clerk (John Hunt), Assistant Clerk (John Haywood), Doorkeeper (Peter Gooding), and Assistant Doorkeeper (James Malloy).  The following delegates to the House of Commons were elected by the voters of North Carolina to represent each county and district:

Senate members

The Senators elected a President (Alexander Martin), Clerk (John Haywood), Assistant Clerk (Sherwood Haywood), Doorkeeper (William Murphy), and Assistant Doorkeeper (Nicholas Murphy).  The following Senators were elected by the voters of North Carolina to represent each county:

Legislation
The assembly passed the acts concerning:

 establishing a post-war militia
 jurisdictions of the Court of Pleas and Quarter Sessions, North Carolina justice of the peace and other courts
 regulation of commerce and imports
 collection of public debt
 emitting paper currency
 regulating the towns of Wilmington, Edenton, and Fayetteville; regulating and restraining the conduct of slaves and others in these towns
 securing and quieting forfeited estates
 raising revenues and suppressing excessive gambling
 levying taxes and redemption of Continental money
 opening land offices
 dealing with traitors and loyalists
 registration of marriage contracts
 liquidating accounts of officers and soldiers of the continental line and reviving district board of auditors for a limited time
 relief of disabled veterans of the late war
 recovering artillery belonging to the state that was thrown into the river at Edenton
 settling accounts between the United States and the state of North Carolina
 making provision for the poor, including building houses for them
 regulation of the town of Tarborough
 resolving disputes regarding building mills in certain counties
 relief of children and widows of soldiers that died in the service of the United States
 creating Rockingham County from Guilford County and selecting board of trustees for Salisbury Academy in Salisbury District
 annexing part of Pitt County to Beaufort County
 preventing blocking or obstructing of ways leading to houses of public worship
 empowering County Courts of Pleas and Quarter Session to deal with public roads, ferries and bridges
 securing literary property
 duties and salaries of public printer
 destruction of wolves, wildcats, panthers, bears, crows, and squirrels in several counties
 promoting learning in Davidson County at Davidson Academy
 establishing Grove Academy in Duplin County
 conveying common land to Smith Academy in Edenton
 establishing Kinston Academy in Dobbs County
 repairing jails and court houses, establishing a gaol in Edenton District
 changing the location of the county court in Beaufort County from Bath to Washington
 acts dealing with personal estates
 pardoning the citizens of Washington, Sullivan and Green counties if they return to allegiance to North Carolina
 establishing a Superior Court in Davidson County
 temporarily preventing distillation of spirituous liquors in Davidson County
 appointing tobacco inspectors in some counties
 establishing towns: on the land of Whitmell Hill in Martin County on the Roanoke River; on the lands of Luke Mizell and William MacKay in Martin County; on the land of Mial Scurlock in Chatham, County; on the land of Jessee Peacock in Sampson County; in Lincoln County; at Guilford Courthouse named Martinville; in the fork of the Cumberland and Red River on the east side of the Red River in Davidson County; Morgan in Morgan District

For additional details on minutes of the assembly and laws, see Legislative Documents.

Notes

References

1785
General Assembly
 1785
 1785